Lucinico is a frazione in Gorizia, in Friuli-Venezia Giulia.

The frazione lies 4.88 kilometres from the town of Gorizia.

In Literature
Lucinico is featured in the last chapter of Italo Svevo's novel Zeno's Conscience. In May 1915 the book's protagonist, a businessman from Trieste, comes with his wife and children to spend a vacation at a rented house in Lucinico. The outbreak of war between Italy and Austro-Hungary turns Lucinico into a war zone and the protagonist - setting out on a casual morning stroll without his hat and jacket - finds the front suddenly cutting him off from his family.

References

Frazioni of the Province of Gorizia
Former municipalities of Friuli-Venezia Giulia